The Hyundai Mighty II (hangul:현대 마이티 투, 현대 마이티 II) is a line of medium-duty commercial vehicles built by Hyundai Motor Company. The range was primarily available in Korea and some other Asian countries, although it was also sold in the United States. The Mighty II was manufactured beginning in August 1997 with the first cars going to Korea. Other regions for which the Mighty II was imported or manufactured included Europe, the Middle East, and North America. In many markets the Mighty II was very expensive and was replaced by the Hyundai Truck when that model became available. Production of the Mighty II ended in 2004.

The overseas was another important market for the Mighty II - to the extent that it was manufactured there from the 1990s using many local components.

Most models of the truck are distinguishable by a front 'Mighty II' and 'Mighty II HSV' badge, but the common Hyundai badge is usually used on the rear.

In United States, it was also sold as the Bering LD.

Models
Hyundai Mighty II is a truck design by Hyundai Motor Company Jeonju Design Center, Rebadged in Bering MS, Manufacture period: Wide Cab - 1998-2004 (from 2004 manufacturing to Hyundai e-Mighty), Narrow Cab QT - 1998-current

Current models
Current models for sale include the HD65, HD72 and the HD78. There is a choice of four cabs (Narrow, Standard/Wide, Super and Double Cab) and two wheelbases (Short and Long Wheelbase), but not all combinations are available for each model.

There are a choice of six engines available, all four-cylinder diesels from the Hyundai's D4 engine family.

Model name (South Korea)
Wide Cab
Gold
Super
Deluxe
Narrow Cab QT
Super
Hi-Super
HD78

Ton type
Wide Cab
2.5t, 3.5t
Narrow Cab QT
3.5t, 5.2t

Lineup
Other special vehicle models in Hyundai commercial vehicles
Standard Cab Low Long Cargo (2.5t, 2t QT, 2.5t QT)
Standard Cab Shot Cargo (2.5t, 2t QT, 2,5t QT)
Standard Cab Long Cargo (2.5t, 3.5t, 2t QT, 2.5t QT)
Double Crew Cab Long Cargo (2.5t)
Standard Cab Shot Dump (2.5t, 3.5t, 2t QT, 2.5t QT)

Notes

References

Rear-wheel-drive vehicles
Mighty II